Izvestia ("The News") is a daily broadsheet newspaper in Russia. Founded in 1917, Izvestia, which covered foreign relations, was the organ of the Supreme Soviet of the Soviet Union, disseminating official state propaganda. It is now described as a "national newspaper" of Russia.

The word izvestiya in Russian means "bring news" or "tidings", "herald" (an official messenger bringing news), derived from the verb izveshchat ("to inform", "to notify").

Origin

Initially, the paper expressed Menshevik and Socialist-Revolutionary Party views; however, they were later purged by the Bolsheviks.

In August 1917, it took the title News of the Central Executive Committee of the Petrograd Soviet of Workers' and Soldiers' Deputies. By October 1917 it became News of the Central Executive Committee of the Soviets of Working and Military Deputies, and was eventually re-titled News of the Soviets of People's Deputies.

After the Second All-Union Congress of Soviets, Izvestia became an official newspaper of the Soviet government (Central Executive Committee of the Supreme Soviet of the Soviet Union and Sovnarkom).

History

1917–1991

During the Soviet period, while Pravda served as the official mouthpiece of the Communist Party, Izvestia expressed the official views of the Soviet government as published by the Presidium of the Supreme Soviet of the USSR. The full name was Izvestiya Sovetov Narodnykh Deputatov SSSR (in Russian, Известия Советов народных депутатов СССР, the Reports of Soviets of Peoples' Deputies of the USSR).

The Izvestia Trophy ice hockey tournament was named after the newspaper between 1969 and 1996.

Nedelya was the weekend supplement of Izvestia.

1992–present
Following the dissolution of the Soviet Union, Izvestia now describes itself as a "national newspaper" of Russia. The newspaper was owned by a vast holding company of Vladimir Potanin which had close ties with the government. A controlling stake in Izvestia was purchased by state-owned Gazprom on 3 June 2005, and included in the Gazprom Media holding. According to the allegations of the Committee to Protect Journalists, Raf Shakirov, editor-in-chief of Izvestia, was forced to resign because the government officials did not like the paper's coverage of the Beslan school hostage crisis. Other sources informed that Potanin had asked him to leave for fear the Kremlin would be riled by the explicit photographs of the massacre published by Izvestia. As of 2005, the circulation of Izvestia was 240,967. Its 2007 circulation certified by TNS Gallup Media was 371,000 copies. Until his death on 1 October 2008, the chief artist was Boris Yefimov, the centenarian illustrator who had worked as Joseph Stalin's political cartoonist.

In 2008, Gazprom Media sold Izvestia to National Media Group.

See also
 Izvestia Moskovskogo Soveta Rabochikh Deputatov
 Mass media in Russia
 Pravda

References

Further reading
 Merrill, John C. and Harold A. Fisher. The world's great dailies: profiles of fifty newspapers (1980) pp 170-76

External links

 Official Izvestia website 
  
  
 English translations of Izvestia articles at nonprofit WorldMeets.US
 "Izvestia" digital archives in "Newspapers on the web and beyond", the digital resource of the National Library of Russia

Newspapers published in the Soviet Union
Russian-language newspapers published in Russia
Eastern Bloc mass media
Propaganda in the Soviet Union
Gazprom subsidiaries
Publications established in 1917
1917 establishments in Russia
Russian-language newspapers
Newspapers published in the Russian Empire
Newspapers published in Russia
Mass media in Saint Petersburg
Mass media in Moscow